Alive in Wild Paint (formerly known as Goodbye Tomorrow) was an indie rock band from Phoenix, Arizona, formed in 2003. Since early 2009, they have been on a silent hiatus.

Biography 
Since the group's original formation in 2003, the band's line-up underwent much change. Minus Matt Gilbert, David Roat was added to the line-up in 2004 and Travis Bryant was added in 2006 and came almost directly from Tooth and Nail Records' act, Terminal. Matt Grabe was also added in 2006 and Austin Wilson was the latest addition to the band in 2007. The band signed to Equal Vision Records, through which they first released a 3 song self-titled EP under the name Goodbye Tomorrow.

On September 29, 2007, the group changed their name to Alive in Wild Paint, following the lineup changes. The name comes from Richard Bach's 1977 novel Illusions. They released one album, Ceilings, which was produced by Mark Trombino and released in 2008. In early August 2008, the band had their trailer and gear stolen. Shortly thereafter, the band was placed on their record label's list of inactive bands.

Members
Final Members
Travis Bryant - Vocals / Guitar || 2007 - 2009
Matt Grabe - Guitar / Piano || 2006 - 2009
David Roat - Bass Guitar || 2006 - 2009
Austin Wilson - Drums ||  2008-2009

Former members
Matthew Gilbert - Vocals / Piano / Acoustic Guitar || 2003 - 2007
Joshua Niles - Drums / Percussion || 2003 - 2008 
Josh Johnson - Guitar / Bass Guitar / Acoustic Guitar || 2003 - 2008
Roger Willis - Bass Guitar / Guitar / Backing Vocals || 2003
Brandon Bowman - Guitar || 2003
Josh Rodriguez - Bass Guitar || 2003
Dan Parker - Bass Guitar || 2003
Jared Wallace - Bass Guitar || 2004 - 2005
James Cawley - Guitar || 2003

Discography 
Goodbye Tomorrow
Tied by Miles EP (Self-released, 2004)
Goodbye Tomorrow EP (Equal Vision Records, 2006)

Alive in Wild Paint
Ceilings (Equal Vision Records, 2008)

References

External links
Official Website [Now defunct]
MySpace
PureVolume
'Time Restrains' from "Tied by Miles" EP
'By a Thread' from "Tied by Miles" EP
'Crimson Roads' from "Tied by Miles" EP
'Tied by Miles' from "Tied by Miles" EP

Equal Vision Records artists
Indie rock musical groups from Arizona
Musical groups established in 2003
Musical groups from Phoenix, Arizona